Joseph Colony is a Christian neighborhood located in Lahore, Pakistan.

References

Christianity in Lahore
Geography of Lahore